The first season of Pilipinas Got Talent premiered on ABS-CBN on February 20, 2010, replacing The Singing Bee Season 5 with Cesar Montano upto finale episode on February 6, 2010. Billy Crawford and Luis Manzano take role as the hosts of the show. The judges include former ABS-CBN executive Freddie M. Garcia, Kris Aquino, and Ai-Ai de las Alas. Auditions were then held in several key cities in the Philippines including Batangas, Cebu, Baguio, Cagayan de Oro, and Davao for three days and Manila for four days.

Auditions

The audition process took place throughout November and December 2009. The judges visited  Philippine cities including Batangas, Cebu, Baguio, Cagayan de Oro, and Davao for three days and Manila for four days. The first eighteen shows reflected on the successful, and unsuccessful auditions overall. The first audition episodes were followed in a particular city. However, in later episodes until the seventeenth, aired auditions featured all random cities visited.

Judges' Cull
The second round is the Judges' Cull of all 220 successful auditioned acts. It was held  in the Bellevue Hotel located in Metro Manila. This is the round where the judges pick the best 36 acts to enter the live semi-finals. The cull was divided in half throughout the country, 19 acts were picked from the Visayas and Mindanao auditions and the other 17 were taken from Luzon and Metro Manila auditions. The top 36 acts will compete for the live semi-finals round for six weeks.

Top 36 Results Summary

Semifinals
The semifinals ran from May 1 to June 6, 2010. The first four weeks were held in AFP Theater in Camp Aguinaldo, Quezon City and in Tanghalang Pasigueño in Pasig for the fifth and sixth week. The result shows were always held in Dolphy Theater in ABS-CBN Studios.

There are two ways to vote — SMS and online voting.

The three acts that received the lowest votes are automatically eliminated. The act with the highest number of votes advances to the grand finals. The acts that placed second and third are subject to judges' vote. The act that receives at least 2 votes proceeds to the grand finals, while the other is eliminated.

Semifinals summary

Week 1 (May 1 & 2)

Week 2 (May 8 & 9)

Week 3 (May 15 & 16)

 Delleva originally got three buzzers due to noisy and pitchy sound caused by the sound system. He was however given the chance to perform again without being buzzed out by the judges.

Week 4 (May 22 & 23)

 Tulabing also had an initial three buzzes due to low microphone volume. He actually had to repeat three times as his hat was missing on his second attempt.

Week 5 (May 29 & 30)

Week 6 (June 5 & 6)

Grand Finals
The grand finals were held in the Araneta Coliseum. Twelve acts that won in the semifinals performed again to win the title of the first Pilipinas Got Talent grand winner. Jovit Baldivino was declared as the winner, besting 11 talents in the grand finals.

Color key

National Ratings
Pilipinas Got Talent Season 1 hits all-time high 43.3% national rating. 
The National Ratings came from the whole-wide Philippine coverage of  TV audience ratings from Kantar Media Philippines.

References

Pilipinas Got Talent
2010 Philippine television seasons